The Italian pool frog (Pelophylax bergeri) is a species of frog in the family Ranidae. Found on the mainland of Italy and the Mediterranean islands of Sicily, Elba, Corsica and Sardinia, its natural habitats are rivers, swamps, freshwater lakes and freshwater marshes. It is not considered threatened by the IUCN.

Description
The tongue is notched and it has vomerine teeth in the roof of its mouth. The skin is smooth and not warty. The colour is variable and depends on the animal's location, but is usually some shade of green with black spots, but may be reddish-brown or grey. There is a pale stripe running along the centre of the back. The underparts are greyish-white marked with dark blotches and the hind legs have dark stripes. Males have a pair of external vocal sacs on either side of the mouth which are only visible when the animal is calling. The voice is a series of guttural croaks each lasting up to one and a half seconds.

Distribution and habitat
The Italian pool frog is native to the mainland of Italy, south of Rimini and Genoa, and to the islands of Sicily, Elba and Corsica. It has been introduced into Sardinia. It has been introduced into the United Kingdom but whether it persists there is unclear.

Status
The main threat to the Italian pool frog is the draining of its aquatic habitats; as a result of this, the population appears to be declining at a slow rate. However, the frog has a wide range, is common in many places and has a large total population, so the International Union for Conservation of Nature has assessed it as being of "least concern".

See also 
 Hybridogenesis in water frogs

References

Pelophylax
Amphibians of Europe
Amphibians described in 1985
Taxonomy articles created by Polbot